Auto-Saharan Companies (in Italian Compagnie Auto-Avio Sahariane (sometimes referred to as "La Compagnia") were special Italian units of desert warfare operating in Libya and Sahara desert during Second World War. Their military operations took place in Egypt, Libya and Tunisia, until the surrender of Italo-German forces in May 1943.

History
The Compagnie were instituted in the late 1930s, after a conversion of dromedary mounted troops called Meharisti, with the task to conduct long range patrols in the desert. These units were formed with mixed Italian and Libyan personnel.

During the North African Campaign these units were tasked to conduct reconnaissance, often in contrast to similar British units like LRDG.

The number of active companies varied from three and five during the war, and each company was equipped with 20 to 30 vehicles and three Caproni Ca.309 "Ghibli" light aircraft for reconnaissance.

In 1940, at the beginning of the war, these companies were part of the Maletti Group but located at the Kufra Oasis. In that part of Italian Libya, a clash took place with British forces at the end of January 1941 at Jebel Sharif.

In this victorious skirmish that took place in the Jebel Sherif valley, British members of the Long Range Desert Group (LRDG) suffered one man killed and two taken prisoner, included Major Clayton, and the loss of three desert vehicles. The Italians suffered three killed and three injured. The remaining four British soldiers fled through the Libyan desert to the Nile. Major Clayton was conferred a Distinguished Service Order.

The Compagnie Auto-avio sahariane continued their confrontations with the LRDG in 1941 and 1942, and a raid in Egypt was accomplished under guide of commander Del Pozzo.

At the end of North Africa campaign, in 1943, the surviving vehicles of different companies were reorganized in the Saharian Group ("Raggruppamento Sahariano") of Mannerini (also known as "Gruppo Mannerini"), and used for patrol duties in Tunisia, but they also took part in some skirmishes in the Mareth area (Operation Pugilist), until the final surrender of Axis forces in Africa.

Equipment 
Companies were formed around expert soldiers (called "Arditi Camionettisti"), riding AB 41 armored cars and FIAT and Lancia light trucks customized to operate in the desert; heavily armed with heavy machine guns, light 47 mm and 65 mm guns, and AA 20 mm Breda 35 guns.

The light trucks used by these companies include:
 FIAT-SPA AS37
 FIAT-SPA AS43
 SPA-Viberti AS42
 FIAT 634
AS:  (Northern Africa).

Notes

Bibliography 
 
 
 
 

Company sized units
Army units and formations of Italy in World War II
Desert warfare